The suboccipital triangle is a region of the neck bounded by the following three muscles of the suboccipital group of muscles:
 Rectus capitis posterior major - above and medially
 Obliquus capitis superior - above and laterally
 Obliquus capitis inferior - below and laterally
(Rectus capitis posterior minor is also in this region but does not form part of the triangle)

It is covered by a layer of dense fibro-fatty tissue, situated beneath the semispinalis capitis.

The floor is formed by the posterior atlantooccipital membrane, and the posterior arch of the atlas.

In the deep groove on the upper surface of the posterior arch of the atlas are the vertebral artery and the first cervical or suboccipital nerve.

In the past, the vertebral artery was accessed here in order to conduct angiography of the circle of Willis. Presently, formal angiography of the circle of Willis is performed via catheter angiography, with access usually being acquired at the common femoral artery. Alternatively, a computed tomographic angiogram or magnetic resonance angiogram is performed.

Contents of the suboccipital triangle

1) Third part of vertebral artery
2) Dorsal ramus of nerve C1-suboccipital nerve
3) Suboccipital venous plexus

The purpose of these muscles is to provide fine motor function in movements of the head. The actions of trapezius, sternocleidomastoid and other larger muscles that move the head are refined by the relatively small suboccipital triangle muscles.

Additional images

See also
 Suboccipital muscles
 Occipital artery
 Greater occipital nerve
 Lesser occipital nerve

References

External links

  - "Muscles of the Back - Suboccipital Triangle"
 Description at myqth.com

Human head and neck
Triangles of the neck